The 22973/22974 Gandhidham–Puri Weekly Express is an Express train of Indian Railways that runs between Gandhidham Junction and Puri via Vizianagaram.

It is currently being operated with 22973/22974 train numbers which runs once in a week.

Coach Composition

The train has standard ICF rakes with max speed of 110 kmph. The train consists of 20 coaches.

 1 AC II Tier
 2 AC III Tier
 7 Sleeper Coaches
 7 General Unreserved
 2 Seating cum Luggage Rake
 1 High Capacity Parcel

Route and halts 

The important halts of the train are:

References

External links
22973/Gandhidham - Puri Weekly Superfast Express (via Vizianagaram)
22974/Puri - Gandhidham Weekly Superfast Express (via Vizianagaram)

Transport in Gandhidham
Transport in Puri
Express trains in India
Transport in Kutch district
Rail transport in Gujarat
Rail transport in Andhra Pradesh
Railway services introduced in 2014